John Abley (18 October 1930 – 19 August 2011) was an Australian rules footballer who played with Port Adelaide in the South Australian National Football League (SANFL) between 1950 and 1961.

Hawthorn reserves (1949) 
John Abley grew up in Melbourne. During the 1949 VFL season he played  reserves football with Hawthorn Football Club but turned his back on a possible career with the club in the seniors when he moved to Adelaide, South Australia.

Move to Adelaide 
When Abley moved to Adelaide it initially looked like he would be playing for  Glenelg (as his younger brother Kevin did) instead of Port as after the area he planned on residing in was part of Glenelg's recruiting zone. Port Adelaide officials, at the suggestion of Bob McLean, hastily arranged alternate accommodation in the hope of acquiring his services and Abley debuted for Port Adelaide in 1950.

Port Adelaide (1950-1961) 
A fullback, Abley first played in that position for Port in a "Challenge match" in Broken Hill at the end of his debut season and after impressing was kept there for the remainder of his career. He was a member of the famed Port team which won six premierships in succession from 1954 to 1959, an Australian record.

Abley was a regular South Australian interstate representative and played a total of 23 games for his state. On three occasions Abley was selected as an All-Australian for his performances at the carnivals, in 1956, 1958 and 1961.

In 1959, Abley was named as a life member of the Port Adelaide Football Club because of his talent, his warmth off the field and being one of only six players to play in all of Port Adelaide's premierships in the 1950s (1951, 1954, 1955, 1956, 1957, 1958 and 1959).

Personal life 
Abley died on 19 August 2011, aged 81, after a short illness.

Honours 
In 1998, Abley was inducted into the South Australian Football Hall of Fame.

In 2001 Abley was named as the fullback in Port Adelaide's official "Greatest Team", taking into account all players to have represented the club since 1870.

In 2020, Abley was inducted into the Australian Football Hall of Fame.

References

External links

Port Adelaide obituary

Australian rules footballers from Melbourne
Port Adelaide Football Club (SANFL) players
Port Adelaide Football Club players (all competitions)
All-Australians (1953–1988)
South Australian Football Hall of Fame inductees
2011 deaths
1930 births
Australian Football Hall of Fame inductees
Australian rules footballers from Adelaide